Norsup Airport  is an airfield near Norsup on the island of Malakula, in the Malampa province in Vanuatu. It is one of three airfields on the island, the others being Lamap Airport and South West Bay in the south.

Facilities 

Airlines and destinations

References

External links
 

Airports in Vanuatu
Malampa Province